Nicola Sinnott (born 8 August 1987) is a Republic of Ireland women's international footballer who plays for Wexford Youths of the Women's National League.

Club career
Sinnott played youth football for Boca Juniors of Gorey, then attended University College Dublin on a soccer scholarship. She transferred to Peamount United, where she was part of the 2010 FAI Women's Cup-winning team and the subsequent 2011–12 UEFA Women's Champions League campaign. 

In November 2011, Sinnott signed for Shamrock Rovers ahead of the inaugural 2011–12 Women's National League season. After moving on to Wexford Youths, she found success in the 2014–15 season; being named in the league Team of the Season as the club won the championship.

International career

Sinnott made her international debut at under-17 level for Ireland in April 2004. She was named player of the tournament in a four-team competition hosted in Castlebar. She later played at under-19 level and represented Irish Universities at the World University Games, playing in the 2009 tournament in Belgrade.

In May 2015, Sinnott was called up to the senior national team for the first time, for a friendly in the United States. After the match had been arranged, it was discovered to be outside FIFA's designated dates for international matches, so several of Ireland's first-choice players were not released by their clubs. Sinnott won a debut cap as a late substitute for Stephanie Roche in Ireland's 3–0 defeat.

Personal life
Sinnott is employed as a secondary school teacher in Enniscorthy.

References

External links

Nicola Sinnott at Football Association of Ireland (FAI)

1987 births
Living people
Republic of Ireland women's association footballers
Republic of Ireland women's international footballers
Peamount United F.C. players
Wexford Youths W.F.C. players
UCD Women's Soccer Club players
Alumni of University College Dublin
Women's National League (Ireland) players
Association footballers from County Wexford
Irish schoolteachers
Shamrock Rovers Ladies F.C. players
Dublin Women's Soccer League players
Women's association football fullbacks
Republic of Ireland women's youth international footballers